The Nadanian Variation (sometimes called the Nadanian Attack) of the Grünfeld Defence is a chess opening characterised by the moves:

1. d4 Nf6
2. c4 g6
3. Nc3 d5
4. cxd5 Nxd5
5. Na4

The Nadanian Variation is classified in the Encyclopaedia of Chess Openings with the code D85.

History
The variation is named after the Armenian International Master Ashot Nadanian, who first employed it in 1996. His analysis was published in the 67th volume of Chess Informant.

The birth of the variation has caused major ripples in the chess world. One of the world's most authoritative chess editions New in Chess Yearbook printed on the front cover of the 45th volume the following: "A Revolution in the Gruenfeld: 5.Na4!?!". Grandmaster Jonathan Rowson wrote in his book Understanding the Grünfeld that Nadanian "should be congratulated for seeing what everyone has seen, and thinking what nobody had thought".

The famous chess theoretician Grandmaster Igor Zaitsev wrote in the Russian chess magazine 64:The continuation 5.Na4 of Armenian chess player Nadanian shakes by the extraordinariness. Yes, extraordinariness, because it is unusual among the unusual. A voluntary removal of the knight from the centre, yet that has gone on advantage? Therefore, the value of such centrifugal maneuver is beyond a simple theoretical novelty, in a certain measure it is a challenge to chess foundations, an attempt to grope new properties in two-dimensional chess space.

Theory
White's fifth move is overprotecting the key c5-square in the Grünfeld Defence, thus aspires to prevent an attack on the pawn centre by c7–c5. The extravagancy of White's idea is that they break at once two opening principles: avoid moving the same piece twice, and avoid placing a knight on the edge of the board. However, according to Nadanian, the position after the fifth move is an exception to the rules. By placing the knight on а4, White takes under control the critical square c5, and by next move 6.e4 will return a tempo back, as Black too will play an already developed piece (knight on d5).

White should aspire to the following arrangement: e4, Be3, Be2, Nf3, 0-0, Rc1, Nc5. Black in turn should not allow this scheme for what it is necessary for them to put pressure on the d4 pawn.

The main line continues 5...Bg7 6.e4 Nb6 (Avrukh's 6...Nb4 is also interesting) 7.Be3 0-0 8.Nf3 Bg4 (instead 8...Nxa4 9.Qxa4 c5 10.Rd1 Qb6 11.Rd2 was good for White in Korchnoi–Sutovsky, Dresden 1998) 9.Be2 Nc6 10.d5 Ne5 11.Nxe5 Bxe2 12.Qxe2 Nxa4 with approximately equal chances.

Another possible line is 5...e5 6.dxe5 Nc6 (suggested by Igor Zaitsev and first played by Mikhalchishin), which is according to Lubomir Kavalek "perhaps the only way to punish the white knight's venture to the edge of the board". After 7.a3 (Nadanian's idea) 7...Bf5 8.Nf3 Qd7 9.e3 0-0-0 10.Be2 (Eingorn gives 10.Bb5 Qe6) 10...Qe7 11.Qb3 Bg7 according to Yelena Dembo Black has a powerful initiative (Kantsler–Avrukh, Israel 1999).

Use
The variation's most devoted practitioner has been its eponym, Ashot Nadanian. Various famous players such as Viktor Korchnoi, Maxime Vachier-Lagrave, Bu Xiangzhi, Alexander Riazantsev, Igor Lysyj, Walter Browne, Smbat Lputian, Timur Gareyev, Jonathan Rowson, Andrei Kharlov, Bogdan Lalić have employed it at some time or another, though few have made it their main line against the Grünfeld Defence.

Example games
 Ashot Nadanian (2375) – Yannick Pelletier (2470), Cannes op 18th 1997; D90 1.d4 Nf6 2.c4 g6 3.Nc3 d5 4.cxd5 Nxd5 5.Na4 Bg7 6.Nf3 0-0 7.e4 Nb6 8.Be2 Nxa4 9.Qxa4 b6 10.Be3 Bb7 11.Qc2 Nd7 12.Rd1 e6 13.0-0 h6 14.Bb5 c6 15.Bxc6 Rc8 16.d5 Nb8 17.Qc1 exd5 18.exd5 Nxc6 19.dxc6 Qf6 20.Bxh6 Bxc6 21.Bxg7 Kxg7 22.Qg5 Bxf3 23.Qxf6+ Kxf6 24.gxf3 Rc2 ½–½
 Viktor Korchnoi (2625) – Emil Sutovsky (2595), Dresden zt 1.2 1998; D85 1.d4 Nf6 2.c4 g6 3.Nc3 d5 4.cxd5 Nxd5 5.Na4 Bg7 6.e4 Nb6 7.Be3 0-0 8.Nf3 Nxa4 9.Qxa4 c5 10.Rd1 Qb6 11.Rd2 Bd7 12.Qa3 cxd4 13.Nxd4 Qc7 14.Be2 e5 15.Rc2 Qd8 16.Nb5 Nc6 17.Nd6 Qb8 18.Bc4 Nd4 19.Bxd4 exd4 20.0-0 Be6 21.Bxe6 fxe6 22.Rfc1 Be5 23.Rc7 Bxd6 24.Qxd6 Rf7 25.Qxe6 1–0
 Smbat Lputian (2598) – Alexei Shirov (2746), Montecatini Terme 2000; D85 1.d4 Nf6 2.c4 g6 3.Nc3 d5 4.cxd5 Nxd5 5.Na4 e5 6.dxe5 Nc6 7.Nf3 Ndb4 8.Bg5 Qxd1+ 9.Kxd1 Be6 10.Nc3 Bg7 11.a3 Nd5 12.e4 Nxc3+ 13.bxc3 Nxe5 14.Nxe5 Bxe5 15.Kc2 h6 16.Be3 0-0-0 17.f4 Bg7 18.Be2 Rhe8 19.Rhe1 Bd7 20.Bf3 Ba4+ 21.Kb2 Bc6 22.e5 Bxf3 23.gxf3 Kd7 24.h4 Ke6 25.h5 Kf5 26.Kc2 g5 27.Rg1 gxf4 28.Bxf4 Bxe5 29.Bxh6 Bf6 30.Rad1 Rxd1 31.Rxd1 Rh8 32.Be3 Rxh5 33.Rd7 Be5 34.Rxf7+ Ke6 35.Rf8 Bd6 36.Ra8 a5 37.a4 b6 38.Re8+ Kd5 39.Re4 Rh3 40.Bf4 Rxf3 41.Rd4+ Kc5 42.Bxd6+ cxd6 43.Kb3 d5 44.Rh4 ½–½
 Bu Xiangzhi (2607) – Krishnan Sasikiran (2657), Dos Hermanas Internet Chess Club 2005; D85 1.d4 Nf6 2.c4 g6 3.Nc3 d5 4.cxd5 Nxd5 5.Na4 e5 6.dxe5 Nc6 7.a3 Nxe5 8.e4 Nb6 9.Qxd8+ Kxd8 10.Bg5+ Be7 11.0-0-0+ Ke8 12.Bf4 Bd6 13.Nxb6 axb6 14.Kc2 Bd7 15.Bxe5 Bxe5 16.Nf3 Bf6 17.Bc4 Ba4+ 18.Bb3 Bc6 19.Bd5 Ke7 20.e5 Bg7 21.Bxc6 bxc6 22.Nd4 c5 23.Nc6+ Ke6 24.f4 Ra4 25.g3 b5 26.Rhe1 Rha8 27.Nd8+ Ke7 28.e6 f5 29.Rd7+ 1–0
 Igor Lysyj (2590) – Alexander Morozevich (2762), TCh–RUS Sochi 2007; D85 1.d4 Nf6 2.c4 g6 3.Nc3 d5 4.cxd5 Nxd5 5.Na4 Bg7 6.e4 Nb6 7.Be3 0-0 8.Nf3 Bg4 9.Be2 Nxa4 10.Qxa4 c5 11.dxc5 Bxb2 12.Rb1 Bc3+ 13.Nd2 Bxd2+ 14.Bxd2 Bxe2 15.Kxe2 Nc6 16.Be3 Qc7 17.g3 Rad8 18.Rhd1 Qc8 19.Rxd8 Rxd8 20.Rd1 Rxd1 21.Qxd1 Qg4+ 22.f3 Qh3 23.Bf2 Qxh2 24.Qd7 Kg7 25.Qxb7 Nd4+ 26.Ke3 e5 27.Qe7 Qh5 28.g4 Qh2 29.Kd3 Ne6 30.Be3 Qxa2 31.g5 Qb3+ 32.Kd2 Qb2+ 33.Kd3 a5 34.c6 Qb5+ 35.Kd2 a4 36.f4 Qb2+ 37.Kd1 exf4 38.Bc1 Qd4+ 39.Ke1 Qxe4+ 40.Kd1 Qf3+ 41.Ke1 Qc3+ 42.Kd1 f3 43.Bd2 Qa1+ 44.Kc2 f2 0–1

Modified versions
There are also modified versions of Nadanian's idea.
 1.d4 Nf6 2.c4 g6 3.Nc3 d5 4.Nf3 Bg7 5.cxd5 Nxd5 6.Na4 – Improved Nadanian or Deferred Nadanian
 1.Nf3 d5 2.g3 c5 3.Bg2 Nf6 4.0-0 Nc6 5.d4 cxd4 6.Nxd4 Na5 – Reversed Nadanian
 1.d4 Nf6 2.c4 g6 3.Nc3 d5 4.f3 c5 5.cxd5 Nxd5 6.Na4 – Neo-Nadanian

See also
 List of chess openings
 List of chess openings named after people

References

Further reading

External links

 Article about Nadanian Variation written by GM Igor Zaitsev 

Chess openings
Chess in Armenia
1996 in chess